The Ministry of the Interior of the Republic of Slovenia is responsible for public security and police, internal administrative affairs, and migration in Slovenia.

Ministers of Interior of Slovenia 
 Igor Bavčar, Slovenian Democratic Union / Slovenian Democratic Party (16 May 1990 – 25 January 1993)
 Ivan Bizjak, Slovene Christian Democrats (25 January 1993 – 8 June 1994)
 Andrej Šter, Slovene Christian Democrats (8 June 1994 – 28 February 1997)
 Mirko Bandelj, Liberal Democracy of Slovenia (28 February 1997 – 16 February 1999)
 Borut Šuklje, Liberal Democracy of Slovenia (24 March 1999 – 8 June 2000)
 Peter Jambrek, Independent (8 June 2000 – 5 December 2000)
 Rado Bohinc, Social Democrats (5 December 2000 – 6 December 2004)
 Dragutin Mate, Slovenian Democratic Party (6 December 2004 – 24 November 2008)
 Katarina Kresal, Liberal Democracy of Slovenia (24 November 2008 – 19 August 2011)
 Aleš Zalar, Liberal Democracy of Slovenia (2 September 2011 – 11 February 2012), minister pro tempore
 Vinko Gorenak, Slovenian Democratic Party (11 February 2012 – 20 March 2013)
 Gregor Virant, Civic List (20 March 2013 – 18 September 2014)
 Vesna Györkös Žnidar, Modern Centre Party (18 September 2014 – 13 September 2018)
 Boštjan Poklukar (13 September 2018 – 2020)
 Aleš Hojs, Slovenian Democratic Party (13 March 2020 – 1 June 2022)
 Tatjana Bobnar, Freedom Movement (1 June 2022– 14 December 2022)
Sanja Ajanović Hovnik, Freedom Movement (14 December 2022 - 21 February 2023), minister pro tempore
 Boštjan Poklukar (21 February 2023 – today)

See also 
 Slovenian National Police Force

External links
 Ministry of the Interior homepage

Government of Slovenia
Interior
Slovenia
Organizations based in Ljubljana